Eissa Al-Otaiba (Arabic :عيسى العتيبة) (born 11 May 1998) is an Emirati footballer. He currently plays for Al Dhafra as a midfielder or left back.

Career

Al Jazira
Al-Otaiba started his career at Al-Jazira and is a product of the Al-Jazira's youth system. On 5 April 2017, Al-Otaiba made his professional debut for Al-Jazira against Dibba Al-Fujairah in the Pro League, replacing Mohammed Jamal.

Ittihad Kalba (loan)
On 25 January 2019 left Al-Jazira and signed with Ittihad Kalba on loan until the end of the season. On 19 April 2019, Al-Otaiba made his professional debut for Ittihad Kalba against Ajman in the Pro League, replacing Khaled Al-Shehhi.

Baniyas (loan)
On 20 August 2019 left Al-Jazira and signed with Baniyas on loan of season. On 19 September 2019, Al-Otaiba made his professional debut for Baniyas against Ajman in the Pro League.

Khor Fakkan (loan)
On 1 February 2020 left Baniyas and signed with Khor Fakkan on loan until the end of the season. On 2 July 2020 signed again with Khor Fakkan on loan from Al-Jazira of the season 2020-2021.

External links

References

1998 births
Living people
Emirati footballers
Al Jazira Club players
Al-Ittihad Kalba SC players
Baniyas Club players
Khor Fakkan Sports Club players
Al Dhafra FC players
UAE Pro League players
Association football midfielders
Association football fullbacks
Place of birth missing (living people)